

Poco Bueno was a brown American Quarter Horse stallion foaled April 10, 1944. He was sired by King P-234 and out of the mare Miss Taylor who was by Old Poco Bueno. Poco Bueno was named for his maternal grandsire, and the name means pretty good in Spanish. Poco Bueno is the stallion that is linked to the genetic disease Hereditary Equine Regional Dermal Asthenia (HERDA) in stock horses.

He was a solid brown horse with no white markings.

Show career 
Poco Bueno earned his American Quarter Horse Association, or AQHA, Championship and dominated the Quarter Horse breed for decades. He was purchased by E. Paul Waggoner, of the Waggoner Ranch near Vernon, Texas in 1945 for $5,700. His show career started when he was named champion yearling stallion at the Texas Cowboy Reunion Quarter Horse Show in Stamford, Texas. He was grand champion stallion in the 1940s at Denver's National Western Stock Show, the Southwestern Exposition and Livestock Show in Fort Worth, State Fair of Texas in Dallas and the American Royal in Kansas City.

Cutting horse career 
As a 4-year-old, in 1948, Poco Bueno started his performance career as a cutting horse, trained and shown by Pine Johnson, who worked for E. Paul Waggoner at his 3D Stock Farm in Arlington, TX. He was the first Quarter Horse to be insured for $100,000.00.

Breeding record 
Poco Bueno sired 405 registered AQHA foals, 222 were performers. His most successful crosses were on the daughters of Blackburn. Among his famous get were Poco Stampede, Poco Tivio, Poco Lena, Poco Mona, Poco Bob, Poco Dell, and Poco Pine.

Death and honors 
Poco Bueno died November 28, 1969. Mr. Waggoner left specific instructions in his will that Poco Bueno was to be buried in a standing position in a grave across from the ranch entrance on Texas Highway 283. The plot of ground was landscaped with trees and grass. A granite marker, weighing four tons, was engraved with his name, picture and the inscription Champion and Sire of Champions. In 1990, Poco Bueno was inducted into the American Quarter Horse Hall of Fame.

Pedigree

Notes

References
 Poco Bueno at the AQHA Hall of Fame accessed on November 3, 2015
 Davis, Ray "Headin' an' Heelin'" Western Horseman February 1970 p. 17
 Groves, Lesli Krause "Poco Bueno" Quarter Horse Journal April 1994 p. 18
 Pitzer, Andrea Laycock The Most Influential Quarter Horse Sires Tacoma, WA:Premier Pedigrees 1987
 Simmons, Diance C. Legends: Outstanding Quarter Horse Stallions and Mares Colorado Springs:Western Horseman 1993

External links
 All Breed Pedigree page- select the quarter horse
 Information from the Waggoner ranch 
 Poco Bueno on Foundation Horses.com accessed on July 10, 2007
 Poco Bueno at Quarter Horse Legends

Further reading
 Am J Vet Res. 2005 Mar;66(3):437-42. Inheritance of hereditary equine regional dermal asthenia in Quarter Horses.
 Vet Dermatol. 2004 Aug;15(4):207-17. Hereditary equine regional dermal asthenia ("hyperelastosis cutis") in 50 horses
 Lab Invest. 1988 Aug;59(2):253-62.  An inherited connective tissue disease in the horse.
 Kadash, Kathy "Poco Bueno: Preserving the Past for the Future" Western Horseman April 1993 p. 16-20

Cutting horses
American Quarter Horse sires
1944 animal births
1969 animal deaths
AQHA Hall of Fame (horses)